The 1895 Wyoming Cowboys football team represented the University of Wyoming as an independent during the 1895 college football season. In its second season under head coach Justus F. Soule, a professor of Latin and Greek, the team compiled a perfect 1–0 record. In the program's first intercollegiate football game, the team defeated  from Greeley, Colorado, by a 34–0 score.

For the second of three consecutive years, Herbert J. Brees was the team captain. Brees was a native of Laramie who went on to a career in the United States Army. He retired from the Army in 1941 with the rank of lieutenant general.

Schedule

References

Wyoming
Wyoming Cowboys football seasons
College football undefeated seasons
Wyoming Cowboys football